Harriet Rohmer (born 1938) is an American author, editor, and publisher. She won an American Book Award. She founded Children's Book Press,

Rohmer worked for UNESCO in Paris, on Third World cultural programs. Her work appeared in Passages North, the Louisville Review, the Jewish Women's Literary Annual, and Zeek.

Works 

 Legend of Food Mountain: LA Montana Del Alimento
Mr. Sugar Came to Town, 1989
The Woman Who Outshone the Sun, 
 Last of the Refuge Cities.
 Just Like Me, 
 Uncle Nacho's Hat, 
 Honoring Our Ancestors. 
 Heroes of the Environment, 2009

References

External links 
 http://www.heroesoftheenvironment.com/

1938 births
Living people
American Book Award winners
20th-century American women writers
21st-century American women writers
American women children's writers
American children's writers